Wypych is a surname. Notable people with the surname include:
 Andrew Peter Wypych (born 1954), Polish-born American Roman Catholic bishop
 Filip Wypych (born 1991), Polish Olympic swimmer
 Małgorzata Wypych (born 1971), Polish politician
 Paweł Wypych (1968–2010), Polish politician
 Anna Wypych (born 1996), Brazilian actress, producer and makeup artist.

Polish-language surnames